Jane Mackenzie (née Sym; March 22, 1825 – March 30, 1893) was the second wife of Alexander Mackenzie, the second Prime Minister of Canada.

She married Alexander Mackenzie on June 17, 1853. The couple had no children, although Jane Mackenzie was stepmother to Alexander's daughter from his prior marriage. They are buried at the Lakeview Cemetery in Sarnia, Ontario.

See also  
Spouse of the prime minister of Canada

1825 births
1893 deaths
Spouses of prime ministers of Canada